Very low cerebral blood volume (VLCBV) is a measurement of hemorrhagic transformation degree in the tissue surrounding the lesion in strokes. It is counted as one of the penumbral imaging procedures along with less commonly used methods such as diffusion-weighted imaging (DWI). These are used to predict if there is going to be a hemorrhage after the treatment by tPA. In advanced centers, this measurement helps with using tPA beyond the standard time limit (4.5 hours) without risk of hemorrhage.

References

Further reading 

 
 
 
 
 

Cardiovascular physiology
Internal medicine